The Gang of Eight is a colloquial term for a set of eight leaders within the United States Congress who are briefed on classified intelligence matters by the executive branch.

Under normal conditions, the President of the United States is required by Title  to "ensure that the congressional intelligence committees are kept fully and currently informed of the intelligence activities of the United States, including any significant anticipated intelligence activity as required by [the] title." However, under "extraordinary circumstances", when the President thinks "it is essential to limit access" to information about a covert action, 50 U.S.C. § 3093(c)(2) allows the President to limit reporting.

Background
The term "Gang of Eight" gained wide use in coverage of the controversial warrantless surveillance of American citizens by the National Security Agency under the George W. Bush administration, in the context that no members of Congress other than the Gang of Eight were informed of the program, and they were forbidden to disseminate knowledge of the program to other members of Congress. The Bush administration asserted that the briefings delivered to the Gang of Eight sufficed to provide Congressional oversight of the program and preserve the checks and balances between the executive and legislative branches.

The non-partisan Congressional Research Service prepared a legal analysis on January 18, 2006 that noted: "If the NSA surveillance program were to be considered an intelligence collection program, limiting congressional notification of the NSA program to the Gang of Eight, which some Members who were briefed about the program contend, would appear to be inconsistent with the law, which requires that the 'congressional intelligence committees be kept fully and currently informed of all intelligence activities', other than those involving covert actions."

However, as noted by David S. Kris, former Assistant Attorney General for National Security at DOJ: "As it turns out, however, Rep. Nadler was in fact aware of the bulk metadata collection in 2009, and (as discussed in the text) wrote to the Department of Justice about the collection at the time. In response, DOJ sent him a letter in December 2009 noting that the government was making available to all Members of Congress information about the bulk collection and compliance issues that had arisen." In 2011, as it did in 2009, the Executive Branch again made documentation available to all members of Congress to explain reauthorization of Section 215 of the PATRIOT Act.

Senator Feinstein stressed in July 2013, "I know of no federal program for which audits, Congressional oversight and scrutiny by the Justice Department, the Intelligence Community and the Courts are stronger or more sustained."

Former Attorney General Alberto Gonzales repeatedly made references to the "Gang of Eight" when being questioned about the warrantless surveillance/domestic spying while testifying at the Justice Department Oversight hearing held July 24, 2007.

Members, 118th Congress
Under the "gang of eight" system, the executive branch of the United States discloses highly sensitive intelligence information to the following members of Congress:

 United States House Permanent Select Committee on Intelligence:
 Mike Turner (R-OH), Chair 
 Jim Himes (D-CT), Ranking Member
 United States Senate Select Committee on Intelligence:
 Mark Warner (D-VA), Chair
 Marco Rubio (R-FL), Vice Chair
 Leadership in the United States House of Representatives:
 Kevin McCarthy (R-CA), Speaker
 Hakeem Jeffries (D-NY), Minority Leader
 Leadership in the United States Senate:
 Chuck Schumer (D-NY), Majority Leader
 Mitch McConnell (R-KY), Minority Leader

Members from Past Congresses
117th United States Congress
 United States House Permanent Select Committee on Intelligence:
Adam Schiff (D-CA), Chair
Devin Nunes (R-CA), Ranking member
 United States Senate Select Committee on Intelligence:
 Mark Warner (D-VA), Chair
 Marco Rubio (R-FL), Vice Chair
 Leadership in the United States House of Representatives:
Nancy Pelosi (D-CA), Speaker of the House
Kevin McCarthy (R-CA), Minority leader
 Leadership in the United States Senate:
 Chuck Schumer (D-NY), Majority Leader
 Mitch McConnell (R-KY), Minority Leader

116th United States Congress
 United States House Permanent Select Committee on Intelligence:
Adam Schiff (D-CA), Chair
Devin Nunes (R-CA), Ranking member
 United States Senate Select Committee on Intelligence:
Richard Burr (R-NC), Chair
Mark Warner (D-VA), Ranking member
 Leadership in the United States House of Representatives:
Nancy Pelosi (D-CA), Speaker of the House
Kevin McCarthy (R-CA), Minority leader
 Leadership in the United States Senate:
 Chuck Schumer (D-NY), Majority Leader
 Mitch McConnell (R-KY), Minority Leader

See also
United States Senate Majority Leader
United States Senate Minority Leader
Speaker of the United States House of Representatives
Minority Leader of the United States House of Representatives
U.S. Senate Select Committee on Intelligence
U.S. House Permanent Select Committee on Intelligence

References

External links
Scalable Context Timeline: Bush Administration Broke Law in Failing to Properly Inform Congress of Domestic Surveillance Program, History Commons
50 U.S.C. § 3091
50 U.S.C. § 3093

Legislative branch of the United States government
United States government secrecy